{{DISPLAYTITLE:CH4N2}}
The molecular formula CH4N2 (molar mass: 44.06 g/mol, exact mass: 44.0375 u) may refer to:

 Ammonium cyanide
 Diaziridine